Juris Strenga (born 13 June 1937) is a Latvian actor. He was awarded Latvia's national theatre award, Spēlmaņu nakts, for lifetime achievement in 2016.

Selected filmography
 The Arrows of Robin Hood (1975)
 A Glass of Water (1979)
 The Fairfax Millions (1980)

References

1937 births
Living people
20th-century Latvian male actors